Sarma Cave, located in Gagra District of Abkhazia, a breakaway region of Georgia, is the third deepest recorded cave in the world. Its current depth (1830 m) was measured in 2012 by a team led by Pavel Rudko.

Fauna 
Two species of stygobiont amphipods have been found: Zenkevitchia sandroruffoi living at depths of no more than -350 m and found in other caves of eastern Arabika Massif, in Troika Cave (at -30 m) and in Eagle's Nest Cave (-75 m), and Adaugammarus pilosus inhabiting aquatic biotopes in the deep part of the cave (elevations -1270 m and -1700 m).

See also 
 List of caves
 Speleology
 List of deepest caves

Notes

References

Caves of Abkhazia
Limestone caves
Wild caves
Gagra District